Conus diadema, common name the diadem cone, is a species of sea snail, a marine gastropod mollusk in the family Conidae, the cone snails and their allies.

Like all species within the genus Conus, these snails are predatory and venomous. They are capable of "stinging" humans, therefore live ones should be handled carefully or not at all.

Description
The size of the shell varies between 25 mm and 60 mm. The short spire is conical and tuberculate. The color of the shell is uniformly brown, lineated with chocolate, with sometimes longitudinal white maculations forming a broad central interrupted band, and a few additional maculations on other portions of the surface. The base of the shell is subgranularly striate.

Distribution
This marine species occurs in the Gulf of California, Western Mexico to Panama; off the Galápagos Islands.

References

  Petit, R. E. (2009). George Brettingham Sowerby, I, II & III: their conchological publications and molluscan taxa. Zootaxa. 2189: 1–218
 Puillandre N., Duda T.F., Meyer C., Olivera B.M. & Bouchet P. (2015). One, four or 100 genera? A new classification of the cone snails. Journal of Molluscan Studies. 81: 1–23

External links
 The Conus Biodiversity website
 Cone Shells – Knights of the Sea
 

diadema
Gastropods described in 1834